Huson is a census-designated place and unincorporated community in Missoula County, Montana, United States. Its population was 210 as of the 2010 census.

Huson was established as a railroad station in about 1894. The post office opened as Glaude in about 1897, but was changed to Huson around a year later.

Demographics

References

Census-designated places in Missoula County, Montana
Census-designated places in Montana
Unincorporated communities in Montana
Unincorporated communities in Missoula County, Montana